Mohd Nazrin bin Syamsul Bahri (born 11 September 1990) is a Malaysian professional footballer who plays for UiTM in Malaysia Premier League as a left winger.

Product of PKNS academy, Nazrin are well known for his superb long range shooting accuracy and sometime score wonderful goal from long range effort. Small statue but effective player. Sometimes deployed in flank or centre half. Nazrin helped PKNS to 2016 FA Cup Final. Their first ever final.

Nazrin originally promoted from PKNS President Cup team. The natural left footed player provide various good range of passing from flanker and later during E. Elavarasan helm, he adjusted to more central midfielder role.

With PKNS in recent years are much preferred more senior, established players and formerly capped by national team. Nazrin chance to play are bit in danger. He released by PKNS after 6 season with them.

2019 season he signed by Perlis but later the team was dissolved due to bad debt, unsettled sponsorship deal and overdue salary. The MFL decided to dissolved Perlis and the players given special permission to signed for other team. Nazrin signed by Uitm fc, shah alam based team. Just around the corner where he ply his trade with PKNS. He headed in a winning goal in home fixture against Sarawak.

Career statistics

Club

References

External links
 

1990 births
Living people
Malaysian footballers
PKNS F.C. players
Malaysian people of Malay descent
Association football wingers